The Tamil People's National Alliance (abbreviated TPNA), also known as the Thamizh Makkal Tesiya Kootani (abbreviated TMTK), is a political alliance in Sri Lanka that represents the country's Sri Lankan Tamil ethnic minority. It was formed in February 2020 by a group of Tamil nationalist parties after they broke away from the Tamil National Alliance. The alliance is recognised by the Election Commission of Sri Lanka as registered political party with the fish as its symbol.

History
On 9 February 2020 four parties, consisting of dissident members of the Tamil National Alliance (TNA), signed a memorandum of understanding at the Tilko Hotel in Jaffna to form the Tamil People's National Alliance (Thamizh Makkal Tesiya Kootani) to contest the parliamentary election. The four parties were:
 Eelam People's Revolutionary Liberation Front (EPRLF), led by former MP Suresh Premachandran
 Eelam Tamil Self Rule Party (Eela Thamilar Suyatchchi Kazhagam, ETSK), led by provincial minister Ananthi Sasitharan
 Tamil National Party (Thamizh Thesiya Katchi, TTK), led by former MPs M. K. Shivajilingam and N. Srikantha
 Tamil People's Alliance (Thamizh Makkal Kootani, TMK), led by former chief minister C. V. Vigneswaran

The TPNA claimed that it would give alternative leadership for the Tamil people as the TNA, which had dominated Tamil politics since its formation in 2001, had moved away from its manifesto and had failed to deliver on the pledges made to the Tamil people of north-eastern Sri Lanka.

Vigneswaran's is the alliance's leader while Premachandran is president and Sivasakthy Ananthan is general-secretary. The alliance has an eleven-member governing council chaired by Vigneswaran - six from the TMK, two each from the EPRLF and TTK and one from the ETSK.

Electoral history

Election results

2020 Parliamentary General Election

References

External links

2020 establishments in Sri Lanka
Organisations based in Northern Province, Sri Lanka
Political parties established in 2020
Political party alliances in Sri Lanka
Sri Lankan Tamil nationalist parties